This is a list of members of the Australian Senate following the 2022 Australian federal election held on 21 May 2022. Terms for newly elected senators representing the Australian states begin on 1 July 2022. Terms for senators in the Australian Capital Territory and Northern Territory began on the day of the election, 21 May 2022.

Notes

References 

Members of Australian parliaments by term
21st-century Australian politicians
Australian Senate lists
Australian Senate, 2022-2025
Australia
2020s politics-related lists